The 2017–18 Central Connecticut Blue Devils women's basketball team represented Central Connecticut State University during the 2017–18 NCAA Division I women's basketball season. The Blue Devils were led by eleventh-year head coach Beryl Piper, and played their home games at the William H. Detrick Gymnasium in New Britain, Connecticut as members of the Northeast Conference. They finished the season 7–23 overall, 7–11 in NEC play to finish for a tie in seventh place. Central Connecticut secured a seventh seed in the NEC tournament losing to Robert Morris in the first round.

Roster

Schedule

|-
!colspan=9 style=| Non-conference regular season

|-
!colspan=9 style=| NEC regular season

|-
!colspan=9 style=|NEC Tournament

References

Central Connecticut Blue Devils women's basketball seasons
Central Connecticut Blue Devils
Central Connecticut Blue Devils women's basketball
Central Connecticut Blue Devils women's basketball